The Institute of Engineering & Management is a private engineering and management college  located in Kolkata, West Bengal, India. It is the private engineering college in West Bengal. It is affiliated to MAKAUT. It was established in 1989.

Academics
The undergraduate courses offer B Tech in engineering streams including Computer Science & Engineering, Artificial Intelligence, Machine Learning, Blockchain, IoT, Information Technology, Electrical Engineering, Mechanical Engineering, Electronics & Communication Engineering  and Electrical & Electronics Engineering, while the postgraduate courses offer an M Tech degree. There is a provision for Ph D in Electronics and Communication Engineering and MSc. in Information Science. The institute offers postgraduate diploma course in Management Studies. It also offers five-continent foreign internship to its students.
It's now an autonomous body
Apart from these, the Faculty of Technology offers Bachelor of Computer Applications (BCA) degree course. The institute offers Bachelor of Business Administration (BBA) and Masters in Business Administration (MBA) degree courses at the undergraduate and postgraduate level respectively (with dual major specialization). Kolkata West Bengal and it's now an autonomous body

Ranking

It is a NAAC grade 'A' college.

References

External links 

Engineering colleges in Kolkata
Educational institutions established in 1989
1989 establishments in West Bengal